Emil Larsen (6 April 1888 – 26 June 1942) was a Danish wrestler. He competed at the 1920, 1924 and the 1928 Summer Olympics. He also won a bronze medal at the 1921 World Wrestling Championships.

References

External links
 

1888 births
1942 deaths
Olympic wrestlers of Denmark
Wrestlers at the 1920 Summer Olympics
Wrestlers at the 1924 Summer Olympics
Wrestlers at the 1928 Summer Olympics
Danish male sport wrestlers
Sportspeople from Copenhagen